Kevin Jerome Tiggs (born April 17, 1984) is an American former professional basketball player. He played college basketball for Mott Community College and East Tennessee State University.

College career
As a freshman at Mott Community College in 2005–06, Tiggs played in 30 games for the Bears, averaging 10.9 points, 6.7 rebounds, 1.4 assists and 2.0 steals per game.

As a sophomore in 2006–07, Tiggs was named the NJCAA Coaches Association Division II National Player of the Year and helped the Bears win the NJCAA championship, finishing the year with a 35–3 record. In 33 games, he averaged 18.8 points, 7.2 rebounds and 3.2 steals per game.

In June 2007, Tiggs transferred to East Tennessee State University. As a junior playing for the Buccaneers in 2007–08, he earned second-team All-Atlantic Sun honors and was twice named A-Sun Player of the Week. In 32 games, he averaged 14.6 points, 5.5 rebounds, 1.6 assists and 1.5 steals per game.

As a senior in 2008–09, Tiggs earned first-team All-Atlantic Sun honors. In 34 games, he averaged 21.4 points, 4.8 rebounds, 2.0 assists and 2.1 steals per game.

Professional career
In August 2009, Tiggs signed with BC Ferro-ZNTU of the Ukraine for the 2009–10 season. In 34 games for the club, he averaged 15.0 points, 4.4 rebounds, 2.4 assists and 1.8 steals per game.

In June 2010, Tiggs re-signed with Ferro-ZNTU for the 2010–11 season. In October 2010, he left Ferro-ZNTU after appearing in seven games and signed with APOEL B.C. of Cyprus for the rest of the season. In 12 league games for APOEL, he averaged 14.3 points, 4.4 rebounds, 1.8 assists and 2.5 steals per game.

Tiggs returned to the Ukraine for the 2011–12 season, signing with BC Goverla. In 42 games for the club, he averaged 14.2 points, 4.0 rebounds, 1.9 assists and 1.6 steals per game.

In July 2012, Tiggs signed with JDA Dijon Basket of France for the 2012–13 season. In November 2012, he was released by Dijon after appearing in eight games. In February 2013, he re-signed with BC Govela for the rest of the season. In 18 games for Govela, he averaged 10.1 points, 4.3 rebounds, 1.5 assists and 1.5 steals per game.

On October 13, 2013, Tiggs signed with the Wollongong Hawks for the rest of the 2013–14 NBL season. On February 19, 2014, he underwent surgery on his right knee. The injury kept him out of action for three games, as he returned to the court on March 14. In 26 games for the Hawks in 2013–14, he averaged 14.5 points, 3.3 rebounds, 1.7 assists and 1.0 steals per game. He subsequently earned the NBL Best Sixth Man Award.

On November 1, 2014, Tiggs was selected by the Westchester Knicks in the seventh round of the 2014 NBA Development League Draft. He was later waived by the Knicks on November 11 prior to the start of the regular season. On December 16, 2014, he signed with Namika Lahti of the Finnish Korisliiga as a replacement for the injured Cameron Bennerman. He played out the rest of the season with Namika, and in 30 games, he averaged 15.3 points, 4.3 rebounds, 2.8 assists and 1.7 steals per game.

On October 6, 2015, Tiggs signed with Soproni KC of Hungary for the 2015–16 season. In 36 league games, he averaged 13.3 points, 4.8 rebounds, 2.8 assists and 2.2 steals per game.

On December 2, 2016, Tiggs signed with the Crailsheim Merlins of the German ProA. In 21 games, he averaged 13.6 points, 4.0 rebounds, 2.1 assists and 1.8 steals per game.

References

External links
 East Tennessee State bio
 NBL stats
 Crailsheim Merlins player profile

1984 births
Living people
American expatriate basketball people in Australia
American expatriate basketball people in Finland
American expatriate basketball people in France
American expatriate basketball people in Germany
American expatriate basketball people in Hungary
American expatriate basketball people in Ukraine
American men's basketball players
APOEL B.C. players
BC Hoverla players
BC Zaporizhya players
Basketball players from Michigan
Crailsheim Merlins players
East Tennessee State Buccaneers men's basketball players
JDA Dijon Basket players
Junior college men's basketball players in the United States
Namika Lahti players
Shooting guards
Small forwards
Soproni KC players
Wollongong Hawks players